José Joaquín Martínez Valadez (born 22 February 1987) is a Mexican professional footballer who plays as a right-back for Liga MX club Cruz Azul. His nickname is Shaggy, as he resembles the Scooby-Doo character, Shaggy.

Club career
Martínez played 38 Primera División matches for Club América before being released in 2012.

After spending several seasons at the Ascenso MX with Necaxa, Martínez would finally go on to re surge to first division with Pachuca. With Pachuca, Martínez has won a Liga MX title and has been essential part of Diego Alonso's tactics. Martínez would again spend one semester at Mineros de Zacatecas before returning to Pachuca during the summer 2017 transfer window to replace the departure of Stefan Medina. Martínez left Pachuca to join Morelia on July 1, 2019.

Honours
Pachuca
Liga MX: Clausura 2016
CONCACAF Champions League: 2016–17

Cruz Azul
Liga MX: Guardianes 2021
Campeón de Campeones: 2021
Supercopa de la Liga MX: 2022

References

1987 births
Liga MX players
Living people
Club América footballers
Club Necaxa footballers
C.F. Pachuca players
Mineros de Zacatecas players
Atlético Morelia players
Footballers from Mexico City
Mexican footballers
Association football midfielders